"Caught Up in You" is the first single released from Southern rock band 38 Special's 1982 album, Special Forces. It became their first #1 on the Billboard Top Tracks rock chart. It also became one of the band's two top ten pop hits, reaching #10 on the Billboard Hot 100. Their other Top 10 single, "Second Chance", reached #6 in 1989. The song also went Top 10 in Canada, peaking at #9 on the RPM Singles chart. Don Barnes sang lead vocals on the song.

Track listing
US 7" single
 "Caught Up in You" – 4:37
 "Firestarter" – 5:01

Personnel 

 Don Barnes – rhythm guitar, lead vocals
 Donnie Van Zant – backing vocals
 Jeff Carlisi – lead guitar
 Larry Junstrom – bass guitar
 Steve Brookins – drums
 Jack Grondin – drums

Chart performance

Weekly charts

Year-end charts

See also
List of Billboard Mainstream Rock number-one songs of the 1980s

References

1982 singles
38 Special (band) songs
1981 songs
A&M Records singles
Songs written by Jim Peterik
Songs written by Don Barnes
Song recordings produced by Rodney Mills